Lisa McGrillis (born 3 September 1982, Cheltenham, England) is a British actress.

Early life and education
McGrillis grew up in Scotby, near Carlisle in Cumbria with her mother, a special needs teacher, and her father, an accountant. She studied performing arts at Northumbria University.

Career
McGrillis had a role in The Pitmen Painters, by Lee Hall, in 2007. It transferred to London's National Theatre and then to Broadway.

McGrillis was in Much Ado About Nothing at Shakespeare's Globe in 2011 as Margaret the maid. When Eve Best, the star of the show, fell ill, director Jeremy Herrin asked McGrillis to step up to play Beatrice. She then appeared in The Pass with Russell Tovey at the Royal Court Theatre in 2014.

After appearing in Hebburn, McGrillis was the regular character DS Rachel Coles in Inspector George Gently with Martin Shaw.

McGrillis starred opposite Academy Award nominee Lesley Manville in the BBC sitcom Mum as Kelly, the well-meaning but dim girlfriend of Manville's son, Jason.  In February 2019, she played Hannah Wilde in episode eight of the eighth season of Death in Paradise.  She later played a grass-roots Manchester politician in the third series of Channel 4 Paul Abbott police drama No Offence and, in 2020, appeared as 'Mad Kay' in BBC sitcom King Gary, written by Tom Davis and as Sandra in the Channel 4 drama Deadwater Fell.

On 17 January 2022, it was announced that McGrillis will star as Courtney in new BBC comedy Avoidance, alongside show creator Romesh Ranganathan and Jessica Knappett.

Personal life
Her husband, Stuart Martin, is also an actor; they met at a Christmas party in the National Theatre bar. They have two children. McGrillis is an ambassador for children's charity PIPA.

Filmography

References

External links
 

1982 births
Living people
English stage actresses
English television actresses
21st-century English actresses
People from the City of Carlisle
Actresses from Gloucestershire
People from Cheltenham